Cassida viridis, common name green tortoise beetle, is a species of beetle in the leaf beetle family (Chrysomelidae).

Description
The body is unusually flat and oval-shaped. Thorax and elytra are green, without the markings characterizing other Cassida species. Punctuation on the elytra is entirely uniform. Both the legs and the rather short, threadlike antennae are brown. The underside is black. These extremely mimetic beetles can be encountered from April to October.

Usually they stay on their food plants, which mainly include various mints (Mentha aquatica, Mentha arvensis, Mentha longifolia, Mentha rotundifolia, Mentha suaveolens, Mentha verticillata), but also other plants of family Lamiaceae (Galeopsis grandiflora, Galeopsis speciosa, Galeopsis tetrahit, Galeopsis pubescens, Melissa officinalis, Salvia glutinosa, Salvia officinalis, Salvia pratensis, Stachys palustris, Stachys recta and Stachys sylvatica).

The larvae are very spiny. For protection against enemies and parasites, they usually bear their excrements on two spines on the upper side.

Distribution
This species can be found in most of Europe, in the eastern Palearctic realm, in the Near East, and in North Africa. It has recently been discovered to have been introduced into southern Ontario, Canada, as early as 1974.

Habit
They mainly inhabit low vegetation in open areas, such as meadows or shores.

References

 Synopsis of the described Coleoptera of the World

External links
Atlas of leaf beetles of Russia
Funet
Nature Spot

Cassidinae
Beetles of Europe
Beetles described in 1758
Taxa named by Carl Linnaeus